The Cybele asteroids  (also known as the "Cybeles") are a dynamical group of asteroids, named after the asteroid 65 Cybele. Considered by some as the last outpost of an extended asteroid belt, the group consists of just over 2000 members and a few collisional families. The Cybeles are in a 7:4 orbital resonance with Jupiter. Their orbit is defined by an osculating semi-major axis of 3.28 to 3.70 AU, with an eccentricity of less than 0.3, and an inclination less than 25°. 

The dynamical Cybele group is located adjacent to the outermost asteroid belt, beyond the Hecuba gap  – the 2:1 resonant zone with Jupiter, where the Griqua asteroids are located – and inside the orbital region of the Hilda asteroids (3:2 resonance), which are themselves followed by the Jupiter trojans (1:1 resonance) further out.

Description 

Three known asteroid families exist within the Cybele group: the Sylvia family (603), the Huberta family and the Ulla family (903). A potential fourth family is a small cluster with the parent body . A fifth family, named after 522 Helga, was identified in 2015. 

The Cybele asteroids 87 Sylvia and 107 Camilla are triple systems with more than one satellite. Other large members include 121 Hermione, 76 Freia, 790 Pretoria, and 566 Stereoskopia. 

The group is thought to have formed from the breakup of a larger object in the distant past. While most members are C- and X-type asteroids,  NASA's Wide-field Infrared Survey Explorer also measured albedos of some Cybele asteroids that are typical for stony S-type asteroids.

List 

Total of 2034 Cybeles with osculating semi-major axis between 3.28 and 3.7 AU. Low numbered members of the collisional Sylvia (SYL) and smaller Ulla (ULA) families are also marked.

 65 Cybele
 76 Freia
 87 Sylvia (SYL)
 107 Camilla (SYL)
 121 Hermione
 168 Sibylla
 225 Henrietta
 229 Adelinda
 260 Huberta
 319 Leona
 401 Ottilia
 414 Liriope
 420 Bertholda
 466 Tisiphone
 483 Seppina
 522 Helga
 528 Rezia
 536 Merapi
 566 Stereoskopia
 570 Kythera
 643 Scheherezade
 692 Hippodamia
 713 Luscinia
 721 Tabora
 733 Mocia
 790 Pretoria
 909 Ulla (ULA)
 940 Kordula
 1004 Belopolskya
 1028 Lydina
 1091 Spiraea
 1154 Astronomia
 1167 Dubiago
 1177 Gonnessia
 1266 Tone
 1280 Baillauda
 1295 Deflotte
 1328 Devota
 1373 Cincinnati
 1390 Abastumani
 1467 Mashona
 1556 Wingolfia
 1574 Meyer
 1579 Herrick
 1796 Riga
 1841 Masaryk
 1921 Pala
 2196 Ellicott
 2208 Pushkin
 2266 Tchaikovsky
 2311 El Leoncito
 2634 James Bradley
 2697 Albina
 2702 Batrakov
 2891 McGetchin
 2932 Kempchinsky
 2976 Lautaro (SYL)
 3015 Candy
 3024 Hainan
 3092 Herodotus
 3095 Omarkhayyam
 3141 Buchar
 3273 Drukar
 3368 Duncombe
 3396 Muazzez
 3608 Kataev
 3622 Ilinsky
 3675 Kemstach
 3727 Maxhell
 3789 Zhongguo
 3845 Neyachenko
 4003 Schumann
 4014 Heizman
 4158 Santini
 4169 Celsius
 4177 Kohman
 4236 Lidov
 4423 Golden
 4973 Showa
 5164 Mullo
 5201 Ferraz-Mello
 5301 Novobranets
 5362 Johnyoung
 5370 Taranis
 5495 Rumyantsev
 5780 Lafontaine
 5833 Peterson
 5914 Kathywhaler (SYL)
 6039 Parmenides
 6057 Robbia
 (6103) 1993 HV
 6574 Gvishiani
 6924 Fukui
 6996 Alvensleben
 
 7501 Farra
 
 7710 Ishibashi
 8482 Wayneolm
 8917 Tianjindaxue
 
 9398 Bidelman
 
 9522 Schlichting
 (9552) 1985 UY (SYL)
 9767 Midsomer Norton
 10257 Garecynthia
 10379 Lake Placid
 10653 Witsen
 
 11440 Massironi (SYL)
 
 
 
 12003 Hideosugai
 
 
 
 13096 Tigris
 
 
 
 
 13963 Euphrates
 
 
 
 
 14871 Pyramus
 14994 Uppenkamp
 
 15372 Agrigento
 
 
 
 17427 Poe
 
 
 18150 Lopez-Moreno
 
  (SYL)
 19149 Boccaccio
 19226 Peiresc
 
 
 
 
  (SYL)
 19694 Dunkelman
 19917 Dazaifu
 20664 Senec (SYL)
 
 
 
 
 22692 Carfrekahl
 
 
 
 
 
 
 
 
 
 
  (SYL)
 25851 Browning
  (SYL)
 
 
 
 
 
 
 
 
 
 
 
 
 27719 Fast
 
 
  (SYL)
 
 29419 Mladkova
 
 
 
  (SYL)
 
 31238 Kromeriz
 
 
 
 
 
  (SYL)
 
 
 
 
 
 
  (SYL)
 
 
 
 
 
  (SYL)
 
 
 
 
 
 
 
 (37528) 1975 SX
  (SYL)
 
  (SYL)
 
 
 
 
 
 
 
  (SYL)
 
 
 
  (ULA)
 
 
 
 
 
 
 
 
 
 
 45511 Anneblack
  (SYL)
 
 
  (SYL)
 
 
 
 
 
 
 
 
 
 
 
 
 
 
 
 
 
  (SYL)
 
 
 
 
 
 
  (SYL)
 
 
 
  (SYL)
 
  (SYL)
 
 
 
  (SYL)
 
 
 
  (ULA)
 
  (SYL)
 
 
 
  (SYL)
  (SYL)
 
 
  (SYL)
 
 
 
 
 
 
 
 
 
 
  (SYL)
 
 
 
 
 
 
 
 
 
 
 
 
 
 
 
 
 
 
  (SYL)
  (SYL)
 
 
 
 
 
 
 
 
 
 
 
 
 
 
 
 
 
 
 
 
 
 
 
 
 
 
 
  (SYL)
 
 
 
 
 
 
 
 
 
 
 (85036) 4203 P-L (ULA)
 
 
 
  (SYL)
 
 
 
 88071 Taniguchijiro
 
 
 
 
 
 
 
  (SYL)
 
 
 
 
 
 
  (SYL)
 
 
  (SYL)
  (SYL)
 
 
 
 
  (SYL)
 
 
 
 (96177) 1984 BC
 
 
 
 
 
 
 
 99905 Jeffgrossman
 
 
 
 
 
 
 
 
  (ULA)
 
 
 
  (SYL)
 
  (SYL)
 
 
 
 
 
 
 
 
 
 
  (SYL)
  (SYL)
 
  (SYL)
 
  (SYL)
 
  (SYL)
  (SYL)
 
 
 
 
  (ULA)
 
  (SYL)
  (SYL)
 
 
  (SYL)
 
 
 
 
 
 
  (ULA)
 
  (SYL)
  (SYL)
 
 
 
 
  (SYL)
 
 
 
 
 
 
  (SYL)
 
 
 
 
 
 
 
  (SYL)
 
 
 
 
 128633 Queyras
 
 129259 Tapolca (SYL)
 
 
 
 
 
 
 
 
 
 
 
 
  (SYL)
  (SYL)
 
 
 
  (SYL)
 
 
 
 
  (SYL)
 
 136367 Gierlinger
 
 
 
 
 
 
 
 
 
  (SYL)
 
 
 
  (SYL)
 
  (SYL)
 
 
 
 
 
 
 
 
 
 
 
 145545 Wensayling
 
 
 
 
 
 
 
 
  (SYL)
 
  (SYL)
 
 
 
 
 
 
 
 
 153289 Rebeccawatson (SYL)
 
 
 
 
 
 
  (SYL)
  (SYL)
 
 
 
 
 
 
 
 
 
  (SYL)
 (159367) 1977 OX
 
 
 
 160259 Mareike
 
  (SYL)
 
 
 
  (SYL)
 
  (SYL)
  (SYL)
 
 
 
 
  (SYL)
 
 
 
 
  (SYL)
  (SYL)
 
 
 
 
 
 
  (SYL)
 
  (SYL)
  (SYL)
 
 
 
 
 
  (SYL)
 
 
 
  (SYL)
 
 
  (SYL)
 
 
  (SYL)
 175365 Carsac (SYL)
 
 
 
 
 
 
 
 
  (SYL)
 
 
 
  (SYL)
 
 
 
 
 
 
 
 
  (SYL)
 
 
 
 
  (SYL)
  (SYL)
 
 
 
 
 
 
 
 
 
 
 
 
  (SYL)
 
 
 
 
 
  (SYL)
  (SYL)
 
 
 
  (ULA)
 
 
 
 
  (SYL)
 
 
 
  (SYL)
 
 
 
 
 
 
 
 
 
 
 
 
 
 
 
 
 
 
 
 
 
 
  (SYL)
  (SYL)
 
 
  (SYL)
 
 
 
 
 
 
 
  (SYL)
 
 
  (SYL)
 
 
 
 
  (SYL)
 
 
 
 
 
 
  (SYL)
 
  (SYL)
 
 
 
 
 
  (SYL)
 
 
 
 
 
 
  (SYL)
 
  (SYL)
 
  (SYL)
 
  (SYL)
 
 
  (SYL)
 
 
 
  (ULA)
 
  (ULA)
 
 
 
  (ULA)
 
 
 
 
 
 
 
 
 
 
 
 
 
  (SYL)
 
 
 
 
  (SYL)
 
 
  (SYL)
 
 
  (ULA)
 
 
  (SYL)
 
 
  (SYL)
 
 
 
 
  (ULA)
 
 
  (ULA)
  (SYL)
 
  (SYL)
 
 
 
 
 243285 Fauvaud
 243320 Jackuipers
 
 
 
 
 
 
 
 
 
  (SYL)
  (SYL)
  (SYL)
  (SYL)
 
 
  (SYL)
  (SYL)
  (ULA)
 
  (SYL)
 
 
 
 
  (SYL)
  (ULA)
 
 
  (SYL)
 
 
 
  (SYL)
 
  (SYL)
 
 
  (SYL)
 
 
 
  (SYL)
 
  (SYL)
 249520 Luppino
  (SYL)
 
 
 
 
 
 
 
 
 
  (SYL)
 
 
 
 
 
 
 
 
 
 
 
 
 
 
  (SYL)
 
 
 
  (SYL)
 
 
 
 
  (SYL)
  (SYL)
 
 
  (SYL)
 
 
 
  (SYL)
 
 
  (SYL)
 
  (SYL)
 
 264061 Vitebsk
 
 
 
 
 
 
  (SYL)
 
 
 
 
 
 
 
 
 
 
 
 
 
  (SYL)
 
 
 
  (SYL)
 
 
 
 
 
 
  (SYL)
  (SYL)
  (SYL)
 
 
 
 
 
 
 
 
  (SYL)
 
  (SYL)
  (SYL)
 
  (SYL)
 
 
 
 
  (SYL)
 
 
 
 
 
 
 278447 Saviano
  (SYL)
 
  (SYL)
  (SYL)
 
 
 
  (SYL)
  (SYL)
 
  (SYL)
 
  (SYL)
 
 
 
  (SYL)
  (SYL)
  (SYL)
 
 
  (SYL)
  (SYL)
 
 
 
 
 
 
  (SYL)
 
 
  (SYL)
  (SYL)
 
 
 
 
 
 
 
 
 
 
 
 
  (SYL)
  (SYL)
 
 
 
 
 
 
  (ULA)
 
 
 
  (SYL)
 
  (SYL)
 
  (SYL)
 
  (SYL)
 
 
  (SYL)
 
 
 
  (SYL)
 
 
  (ULA)
 
 
  (SYL)
 
 
 
 
 
  (SYL)
 
  (SYL)
 
 
 
 
 
  (ULA)
  (ULA)
  (SYL)
 
  (SYL)
 
 
  (SYL)
  (SYL)
 
 
 
 
 
 
 
 
 
 
  (ULA)
 
  (ULA)
 
 
 
 
 
  (SYL)
 
  (ULA)
  (SYL)
 
 
  (SYL)
 
 
 
 
 
 
 
 
  (SYL)
 
 
 
  (SYL)
 
 
 
  (SYL)
  (SYL)
 
 
 
 
 
  (ULA)
 
 
 
 
 
 
 
 
 
 
  (SYL)
 
 
 
 
 
 
 
 
 
 
 
 
 
 
 
 
 
  (SYL)
 
  (SYL)
 
 
  (SYL)
 
 
  (SYL)
 
 
 
 
  (SYL)
 
 
 
  (SYL)
  (SYL)
 
 
 
 
 
 
 
  (SYL)
 
  (SYL)
  (SYL)
 
 
 
  (SYL)
 
  (SYL)
 
 
 
 
 
  (SYL)
 
 
 
  (SYL)
 
  (SYL)
 
  (SYL)
 
 
 
 
  (SYL)
  (SYL)
 
  (SYL)
 
  (SYL)
  (SYL)
  (SYL)
  (SYL)
 
  (SYL)
 
 
 
 
  (SYL)
 
 
  (SYL)
 
 
 
  (SYL)
  (SYL)
 
  (SYL)
 
 
 
 
 
 
 
 
 
 
 
 
 
  (SYL)
 
  (SYL)
 
 
 
  (SYL)
 
  (SYL)
 
 
  (SYL)
 
 
 
  (SYL)
 
 
 
  (SYL)
 
  (SYL)
 
 
  (SYL)
 
 
 
 
  (SYL)
 
 
 
 
 
 
 
 
  (SYL)
  (SYL)
  (SYL)
 
 
 
 
 
 
 
  (SYL)
 
 
  (SYL)
 
 
 
  (SYL)
 
  (SYL)
  (SYL)
 
  (SYL)
 
  (SYL)
 
 
 
  (ULA)
 
 
 
 
 
 
 
 
 
 
  (SYL)
 
 
 
 
 
 
 
 
 
  (SYL)
 
 
  (SYL)
 
 
 
 
 
 
  (SYL)
  (SYL)
 
 
 
 
 
 
 
 
 
 
 
 
 
 
 
 
 
  (SYL)
 
  (SYL)
 
 
 
 
 
 
 
 
 
  (SYL)
  (SYL)
 
 
 
 
 
  (SYL)
 
 
 
 
 
 
 
 
 
 
 
 
 
 
  (SYL)
 
 
  (SYL)
 
  (SYL)
 
 
 
 
 
 
 
  (ULA)
  (SYL)
 
 
  (SYL)
 
 
 
 
 
 
 
  (SYL)
  (SYL)
 
 
 
 
 
 
 
 
 
 
 
 
 
 
 
 
 
 
 
 
 
 
 
 
 
 
 
 
 
 
 
 
 
 
 
 
 
 
 
 
 
 
 
 
 
 
 
 
 
 
 
 
 
 
 
 
 
 
 
 
 
 
 
 
 
 
 
 
 
 
 
 
 
 
 
 
 
 
 
 
 
 
 
 
 
 
 
 
 
 
 
 417955 Mallama

See also

References